Budd is a masculine given name. Notable people with the name include:

Budd Boetticher (1916–2001), film director during the classical period in Hollywood
Budd Dwyer (1939–1987), American politician who committed suicide during a televised press conference
Budd Friedman (born 1932), founder and original proprietor and MC of the Improvisation Comedy Club
Budd Grossman (born 1924), American producer and screenwriter
Budd Hopkins (born 1931), central figure in abduction phenomenon and related UFO research
Budd Johnson (1910–1984), jazz saxophonist and clarinetist
Budd Lynch (1917–2012), Detroit Red Wings' public address announcer at Joe Louis Arena
Budd Root (born 1958), American cartoonist, and creator of the independent comic book Cavewoman
Budd Schulberg (1914–2009), American screenwriter, novelist and sports writer

Fictional characters:
Budd, from the two-part film Kill Bill

Masculine given names